Euderces posticus is a species of beetle in the family Cerambycidae. It was described by Francis Polkinghorne Pascoe in 1866 and is known from Colombia and Panama.

References

Euderces
Beetles of Central America
Beetles of South America
Arthropods of Colombia
Beetles described in 1866
Taxa named by Francis Polkinghorne Pascoe